Bellaghy Wolfe Tones Gaelic Athletic Club is a Gaelic Athletic Association club based in Bellaghy, County Londonderry, Northern Ireland.  The club is a member of Derry GAA and currently competes in gaelic football and camogie.

Bellaghy have won 21 Derry Senior Football Championships, four Ulster Senior Club Football Championships and the 1971-72 All-Ireland Senior Club Football Championship. Bellaghy camogie club have won two Derry Senior Camogie Championships.

Football Titles

Senior Football
 All-Ireland Senior Club Football Championship (1)
 1971-1972
 All-Ireland Kilmacud Crokes Sevens Championship (2)
1986, 2002
 Ulster Senior Club Football Championship (4)
 1968, 1971, 1994, 2000
 Derry Senior Football Championship (21)
 1956, 1958, 1959, 1960, 1961, 1963, 1964, 1965, 1968, 1969, 1971, 1972, 1975, 1979, 1986, 1994, 1996, 1998, 1999, 2000, 2005
 Derry Senior Football League (7)
 1947, 1986, 1994, 1998, 1999, 2000, 2004
 Derry Intermediate Football Championship (1)
 1990
 Derry Junior Football Championship (1)
 1962 (won by Bellaghy II)
 Graham Cup (2)
 2000, 2004
 Sean Larkin Cup (4)
 2004, 2005, 2006, 2008, 2018
 Thirds Championship (1)
 2007

Minor Football
 Ulster Minor Club Football Championship 3
 1991, 1994, 2018
 Derry Minor Football Championship 10
 1953, 1954, 1955, 1957, 1961, 1963, 1973, 1991, 1994, 2018
 Derry Minor Football League: 3
 1993, 1994, 2015
 Derry Minor B Football League: 1
 2008

Under 16 Football
 Derry Under-16 Football Championship: 4
 1960, 1981, 1990, 2003
 South Derry Under-16 Football Championship: 4
1960, 1981, 1990, 2003
 South Derry Under-16 Football League: 1
 1988
 Derry Under-16 Football Shield: 1
 2008

Under 15 Football
 Ulster Óg Sport Under-15 Football: 2
 19xx, 2018

Under 14 Football
 Derry Féile na nÓg: 4
 1998, 2001, 2010, 2013
 Derry Under-14 Football Championship: 6
 1998, 2001, 2013, 2016, 2017, 2018
 South Derry Under-14 Football Championship: 3
 1995,1998, 2001
 South Derry Under-14 Football Leagues: 5
 1979, 1994, 1998, 2001, 2013
 South Derry 'B' Under-14 Football Championship: 2
 2005, 2010
 South Derry 'B' Under-14 Football League: 2
 2005, 2010

Note: The above lists may be incomplete. Please add any other honours you know of.

Pitches
Bellaghy's main pitch, Páirc Seán de Brún, is named after their former club chairman Seán Brown who was attacked and abducted by a Loyalist Volunteer Force (LVF) gang on the evening of 12 May 1997 as he locked the main gate of the GAA grounds on the Ballyscullion Road. Less than an hour later the body of the father-of-six was found lying beside his burnt-out car just off the Moneynick Road near Randalstown, County Antrim. He had been shot six times. On 19 January 2004 the Police Ombudsman for Northern Ireland published a report that was highly critical of the police investigation into Brown's killing.

The club also have two full-sized pitches and dressing rooms at Drumanee, just outside the village.

Notable Gaelic footballers
 Tommy Gribben - First Derry man to win an All Ireland medal with St Pat's Armagh in 1946. Derry County Footballer 1945-1955, 1957–1958, Tyrone County Footballer 1956, Ulster Provincial Footballer, Derry Junior Manager and Coach of 1971-72 Bellaghy All-Ireland winning team.
 Tom Scullion
 Tommy Diamond - Former Derry player. First player to captain a county to victory in both All-Ireland Minor (1965) and All-Ireland Under-21 (1968) Championships.
 Laurence Diamond - Former Derry midfielder. Captain of 1971-72 Bellaghy All-Ireland winning team.
 Damian Cassidy - Represented Derry seniors from 1984 until 1996. Left half forward of Derry's 1993 All-Ireland winning team. Managed Bellaghy to senior finals in 2004, 05 & 07, winning in 2005.
 Danny Quinn - Member of Derry's 1993 All-Ireland winning panel.
 Fergal Doherty - Former Derry mid-fielder.

See also 
 Derry Senior Football Championship
 List of Gaelic games clubs in Derry

References

External links 
 Bellaghy GAC Website

Gaelic games clubs in County Londonderry
Gaelic football clubs in County Londonderry